Ben Yehuda Street, known as the "Midrachov", is arguably the most famous street in Jerusalem, along with Jaffa Road. Ben Yehuda Street joins with Jaffa Road and King George Street in the heart of downtown Jerusalem to form the main Downtown Triangle central business district. Closed to vehicular traffic, the street is now Jerusalem's most popular pedestrian mall. The street runs from the intersection of King George Street east to Zion Square and Jaffa Road. The street is named after the founder of Modern Hebrew, Eliezer Ben-Yehuda.

History

Ben Yehuda was already one of Jerusalem's main streets long before the establishment of the State of Israel in 1948. As a busy thoroughfare, it has been a prime target for terrorist bombings between 1948, when the worst atrocity happened, and 2001, during the Second Intifada.

In 1983, the street was closed to automobile traffic. In Hebrew it is called a midrachov (pedestrian mall – a Hebrew neologism formed from the words "midracha" [sidewalk] and "rechov" [street]. Many of the businesses cater to tourists. The street is lined with souvenir and Judaica shops and sidewalk cafes, and street musicians play there throughout the day. It was long considered the "secular heart of Jerusalem", but since the 2000s, disaffected Orthodox Jewish youth have joined the mix of tourists and locals.

See also
Ben Yehuda Street bombings

References

 

Car-free zones in the Middle East
Downtown Triangle (Jerusalem)
Pedestrian malls
Streets in Jerusalem
Tourist attractions in Jerusalem
Year of establishment missing